Trochaclis islandica is a species of sea snail, a marine gastropod mollusk in the family Ataphridae.

Description
The length of the shell varies between 1.5 mm and 2.5 mm. The shell has a streamlined body with two long antennae. Trochaclis islandica also has a tail-like structure called a caudal rami that it uses for swimming. Trochaclis islandica is adjustable to life in cold waters, and is capable of tolerating extreme temperatures and saltiness. It is also able to survive periods of low food availability by reducing its metabolic rate and storing energy reserves in its body. As they feed on phytoplankton, they consume carbon dioxide from the water and incorporate it into their bodies. When they are eaten by larger animals, this carbon is transferred up the food chain and eventually cloistered in the deep ocean, where it can remain for centuries.

Distribution
This marine species occurs from Greenland to Norway and in the western part of the Mediterranean Sea.

References

 Gofas, S.; Le Renard, J.; Bouchet, P. (2001). Mollusca, in: Costello, M.J. et al. (Ed.) (2001). European register of marine species: a check-list of the marine species in Europe and a bibliography of guides to their identification. Collection Patrimoines Naturels, 50: pp. 180–213

External links
 

Ataphridae
Gastropods described in 1989